Patrice (Pam) Speeter Beddor is John C. Catford Collegiate Professor of Linguistics at the University of Michigan, focusing on phonology and phonetics. Her research has dealt with phonetics, including work in coarticulation, speech perception, and the relationship between perception and production.

Education 
Beddor received a B.S. from the University of Minnesota in French. She spent a year of her Ph.D. program studying in Paris at the Universite de Paris VII, Sorbonne from 1976-1977, and returned to the University of Minnesota to finish her Ph.D. in Linguistics in 1982. Her dissertation, entitled Phonological and phonetic effects of nasalization on vowel height, was published by the Indiana University Linguistics Club in 1983.

Career and research 
Beddor held a post-doc at Haskins Labs and was a lecturer at Yale before becoming a linguistics faculty member at the University of Michigan in 1987. In 2011 she was named a John C. Catford Collegiate Professor of Linguistics. She served as the Chair for the Department of Linguistics at the University of Michigan from 2004 to 2010, and later served as interim chair from 2013-2014.

Beddor is focused mostly in the Fields of Phonetics, Perception- Production relations, and Sound change, and much of her research focuses on production, acoustics, and perception of coarticulation. She has also done work in laboratory phonology, especially the phonetic underpinnings of sound change, with an interest in the relation between the cognitive representation and the physical instantiation of speech. She has numerous publications on these topics, in books and prestigious journals.

Teaching 
In addition to research she is an accomplished professor and mentor. She has spent a large part of her career working with undergraduate and graduate students, and has received the University of Michigan LSA Excellence in Education award, as well as the Rackham School of Graduate Studies John D’Arms award (2002).

Honors 
Beddor is an elected member of the International Phonetic Association Council, and is a member of the Weinberg institute for Cognitive Science Executive Committee.

In 2018, Beddor was inducted as a Fellow of the Linguistic Society of America.

Selected publications 
 Patrice Speeter Beddor. 1993. The perception of nasal vowels. In Nasals, Nasalization, and the Velum. Phonetics and Phonology, vol. 5. 171–196. https://doi.org/10.1016/B978-0-12-360380-7.50011-9
 P.S. Beddor. JD Harnsberger, S Lindemann. 2002. Language-specific patterns of vowel-to-vowel coarticulation: Acoustic structures and their perceptual correlates. Journal of phonetics 30: 591–627. https://doi.org/10.1006/jpho.2002.0177
 Maria-Josep Sole, Patrice Speeter Beddor & Manjari Ohala (Editors). 2007. Experimental approaches to phonology. Oxford University Press. 
 Beddor, P. S. (2009). A Coarticulatory Path to Sound Change. Language, 85(4), 785–821. 
 Beddor, P. S. 2012. Perception grammars and sound change. The Initiation of Sound Change:  Production, Perception, and Social Factors, eds. M-J. Solé and D. Recasens, pp. 37–55. John Benjamins.
 Beddor, P. S. 2013. Speech perception. Oxford Bibliographies Online: Linguistics, ed. M. Aronoff.  http://www.oxfordbibliographies.com/obo/page/linguistics

References
University of Michigan bio of Beddor

University of Minnesota College of Liberal Arts alumni
University of Michigan faculty
Living people
Linguists from the United States
Women linguists
Year of birth missing (living people)
Phoneticians
Haskins Laboratories scientists
Fellows of the Linguistic Society of America